Tony Jantschke (born 7 April 1990) is a German professional footballer who plays as a defender for Bundesliga club Borussia Mönchengladbach.

Career statistics

Club

References

External links
  
 

Living people
1990 births
People from Hoyerswerda
Association football defenders
German footballers
Germany under-21 international footballers
Germany youth international footballers
Borussia Mönchengladbach players
Borussia Mönchengladbach II players
Bundesliga players
Footballers from Saxony